Cancellaria obtusa is a species of sea snail, a marine gastropod mollusk in the family Cancellariidae, the nutmeg snails.  Its shell size ranges from 30–45mm.

References

Cancellariidae
Gastropods described in 1830